The World is an Australian news program which broadcasts on ABC News from 10pm to 11pm on weekdays.

The program is hosted by Beverley O'Connor and airs live in all Australian time zones on the ABC News channel. It is also streamed live on the ABC's website and broadcast live on Foxtel pay television service and also broadcast on Australia Plus throughout the Asia-Pacific region.

History
The program commenced broadcasting on 22 July 2010, the same evening on the launch of ABC News 24, with then host Scott Bevan presenting its first edition. The program originally aired at 9pm to 10pm and had a strong focus on overseas news.

The World was originally produced from the ABC Ultimo Centre in Sydney before moving to the ABC Southbank Centre in Melbourne in early 2014 and with this change it moved to a later time-slots from 10.00pm to 11.00pm along with new hosts Jim Middleton and Zoe Daniel.

In September 2014, ABC received budget cuts from the Federal Government, leaving Jim Middleton to accept a redundancy package and Zoe Daniel moved back into ABC News reporting duties. The program managed to survive the budget cuts with Beverley O'Connor taking over as the permanent host, while still focusing on overseas news abroad the format was slightly modified to incorporate more localised stories from around Australia.

Presenters 
Beverley O'Connor – host (2014–present)
Graham Creed – weather (2010–present)
Yvonne Yong – host (2018–present)

Past Presenters

Auskar Surbakti – business and occasional fill-in presenter (2014–2017)
Jim Middleton – co-host (2014)
Zoe Daniel – co-host (2014)
Jane Hutcheon – host (2013–2014)
Jeremy Fernandez – host (2013–2014)
Scott Bevan – host (2010–2013)

The World This Week
The World This Week is broadcast on ABC Australia each Saturday Morning from 4.00am to 4.30am and the ABC News channel each Saturday Morning from 4.30am to 5.00am and 11.30am to 12.00pm, as well as the ABC main channel is repeated each Sunday Morning from 10.30am to 11.00am hosted by Beverley O'Connor. The show recaps the main overseas news and current affairs from the week and is also replayed on ABC News channel and ABC Australia throughout that day.

References

External links
 ABC News website
 The World website

2010 Australian television series debuts
ABC News and Current Affairs
Australian television news shows
Australian Broadcasting Corporation original programming
English-language television shows
Television shows set in Melbourne